Sympistis regina is a species of moth in the family Noctuidae (the owlet moths).

The MONA or Hodges number for Sympistis regina is 10073.

References

Further reading

 
 
 

regina
Articles created by Qbugbot
Moths described in 1902